Arthur Hale Curtis (May 20, 1881 – November 13, 1955) was an American football player, coach, and gynecologist. He served as the head coach at the University of Kansas in 1902 and at the University of Wisconsin–Madison from 1903 to 1904, compiling a career college football record of 17–10–1. Curtis earned an MD degree from Rush Medical College in 1905. He interned at Cook County Hospital and became a member of the Northwestern University Medical School faculty in 1910. Curtis was born on May 20, 1881, in Portage, Wisconsin. He died of a heart attack in 1955.

Head coaching record

References

1881 births
1955 deaths
19th-century players of American football
American football tackles
American gynecologists
Kansas Jayhawks football coaches
Wisconsin Badgers football coaches
Wisconsin Badgers football players
Northwestern University faculty
Rush Medical College alumni
People from Portage, Wisconsin
Coaches of American football from Wisconsin
Players of American football from Wisconsin